This page lists the World Best Year Performances in the year 1982 in the Men's hammer throw. One of the main events during this season were the 1982 European Athletics Championships in Athens, Greece, where the final of the men's competition was held on September 10, 1982. (The women did not compete in the hammer throw until the early 1990s.) Soviet Union's Sergey Litvinov broke the world record in 1982 season.

Records

1982 World Year Ranking

References
apulanta
hammerthrow.wz

1982
Hammer Throw Year Ranking, 1982